Sidi Khouïled is a district in Ouargla Province, Algeria. It was named after its capital, Sidi Khouïled. As of the 2008 census, the district had a total population of 32,792. Most of the population of this district lives just to the west of the provincial capital, Ouargla.

Communes
The district is further divided into 3 communes:
Sidi Khouïled
Aïn Beida
Hassi Ben Abdellah

References

Districts of Ouargla Province